Peter FitzGerald (born 1950) is a Northern Irish biochemist and businessman, and the founder and owner of Randox Health.

FitzGerald was born in Belfast, and his parents moved to Crumlin. He was educated at Wallace High School, Lisburn, followed by a degree in biochemistry from the University of Strathclyde, and a PhD from the National Institute for Medical Research in London. FitzGerald was a junior fellow at Queen's University Belfast, before leaving to start his own company.

FitzGerald started Randox in 1982, aged 32, from a small lab in a chicken house in Randox Road, Crumlin, County Antrim, at the rear of his parents' farm.

In 2017, The Sunday Times Rich List estimated his net worth at £255 million, and in 2020 at £215 million.

FitzGerald is married to Nuailin, which he has called his "best business decision". In 2016, they had two children, Peter (aged 18) and Angharad (16). He is "a keen polo player", and Randox hosts an annual polo tournament in Errol, Perthshire, Scotland. Randox Health began sponsoring the Grand National in 2016, and in January 2021 the initial arrangement was extended to 2026.  Fitzgerald stated how much he enjoyed working with the Jockey Club's team at Aintree and that he was looking forward to five more years of involvement. In 2020, he said that he had no plans to retire.

References

Living people
Alumni of the University of Strathclyde
National Institute for Medical Research faculty
British company founders
People from County Antrim
People educated at Wallace High School, Lisburn
1950 births